Magnetic Springs is an unincorporated community in Hendricks County, Indiana, in the United States.

The Cartersburg Springs (or Magnetic Springs) once flowed nearby.

References

Unincorporated communities in Hendricks County, Indiana
Unincorporated communities in Indiana